Market Explorer is an online tool whose main purpose is to allow strategy and planning executives to see which countries offer the greatest opportunities for their products and services. The tool was launched in November 2015 by EIU Canback, a management consulting firm that leverages predictive analytics for strategic purposes. Data is available from 2005 to 2030, with the aim of helping businesses to form a view on markets over time.

See also
Forecasting
Market (economics)
Strategy

References

Statistical forecasting
Marketing techniques
Online companies of the United States